The Basílica Santuario Nacional de Nuestra Señora de la Caridad del Cobre (National Shrine Basilica of Our Lady of Charity) is a Roman Catholic minor basilica dedicated to the Blessed Virgin Mary located in Santiago de Cuba, Cuba.

History
It was built in 1926 in the village of El Cobre about 12 miles west of Santiago de Cuba. It is a 3 aisled church on the hill "Cerro de la Cantera" and is linked to the village by a flight of 254 steps.  It has a central bell tower and two side towers crowned by red-brick domes.

The basilica is under the circumscription of the Roman Catholic Archdiocese of Santiago de Cuba. The basilica was decreed on December 22, 1977.

Gallery

See also

Our Lady of Charity

References

External links

Churches in Cuba
Buildings and structures in Santiago de Cuba Province
Roman Catholic churches completed in 1926
Tourist attractions in Santiago de Cuba Province
Roman Catholic shrines in Cuba
20th-century Roman Catholic church buildings in Cuba